Gibsland is a town in Bienville Parish in northern Louisiana, United States. As of the 2020 census, its population was 773. The town is best known for its connecting railroads, as the birthplace of the defunct historically black Coleman College, and for the nearby shootings in 1934 of the bandits Bonnie and Clyde.

Gibsland native John McConathy was a champion basketball player at Northwestern State University in Natchitoches, Louisiana, who later was the superintendent for the Bossier Parish School Board, in which capacity he was the guiding force behind the establishment of the $57 million Bossier Parish Community College.

Coleman College 

In 1890, with ten students, Coleman Baptist Male and Female College opened its doors to educate the children of nearby freed slaves. The institution produced primarily teachers and preachers.

There were eight buildings which included classrooms, auditorium, dormitories, and an administrative building. The college offered a choir, glee club, and intercollegiate athletics. Nicknamed the Bulldogs, Coleman College's chief athletic rival was the historically black Grambling College Tigers in Grambling in Lincoln Parish, subsequently Grambling State University. Enrollment at Coleman reached as high as four hundred in some years. 

The college closed in Gibsland in 1944. Among its graduates were the first president of Southern University in Baton Rouge, Dr. J. S. Clark, and Ada Bell Lewis Coleman. Ada Coleman was the mother of Mildred Coleman Marks, Geraldine Coleman Gaillord, and the deceased McVicker Monroe Coleman, Jr., and Georgia Coleman McClaron.

Professor Coleman, founder and president of Coleman College, died of injuries sustained in an automobile accident in March 1927 in Jackson, Mississippi. His great-grandson, John R. Marks, III, in 2003 became the mayor of the capital city of Tallahassee, Florida.

Later in 1944, Coleman College re-opened for another decade in Shreveport. By 1946, the trustees had made the last payment on property in the Mooretown community at 3701 Hollywood Avenue, the current location of Winnfield Funeral Home. Decreased enrollment caused the school to close once again in the middle 1950s.

Railroad history 

First incorporated in 1889, the Louisiana & North West Railroad Company operates  of shortline between Gibsland and McNeil, Arkansas. The LNW interchanges on both ends of the line: with the Union Pacific (former St. Louis Southwestern) in McNeil; and with Kansas City Southern (former MidSouth, ICG) at Gibsland.

For many years the road was well-known among railfans for its unusual stable of F7 "covered wagons"—unusual motive power of choice for a backwoods southern shortline. In the early 1990s, the F units were sold off to various places, gradually replaced by Geeps from various locations. The LNW shops are located at Gibsland, a few hundred yards from one of the busiest interchange diamonds in all of the state. For decades, three different railroads interchanged in Gibsland. The switching activity could get so hectic the daily routine was known among railfans as the "Gibsland Shuffle."

Geography
Gibsland is located in northern Bienville Parish at  (32.542675, -93.053511).

Demographics

As of the 2020 United States census, there were 773 people, 261 households, and 161 families residing in the town.

Gallery

Education
The Bienville Parish School Board operates the K-12 Gibsland-Coleman Complex in Gibsland.

Arts and culture

Festivals
The Jonquil Jubilee and Historic and Garden Tour and the Bonnie and Clyde Festival are celebrated annually. The Jonquil Jubilee offers advice to area gardeners from botanists.

Bonnie and Clyde
The Bonnie and Clyde Festival is held in Gibsland in mid-May. It features a staged bank robbery by actors portraying the infamous duo. The festival has been featured on the television program Weird U.S. on the History Channel. Bonnie and Clyde were killed off Louisiana Highway 154, south of Gibsland toward Sailes.

Gibsland is home to the Bonnie and Clyde Ambush Museum located in the former cafe where the outlaws ate their last meal, a breakfast. The museum is owned and operated by Perry Carver.  Linton Jay "Boots" Hinton (born January 1, 1934, died December 5, 2016), formerly of Dallas and a son of posse member Ted Hinton managed the museum until his health failed. The museum exhibits also mention the local posse members brought in for jurisdictional reasons, Bienville Parish Sheriff Henderson Jordan (1896–1958) and his chief deputy and successor as sheriff, Prentiss Oakley (1905–1957).

Gibsland-Coleman Alumni 
Gibsland-Coleman Alumni Association was organized in 1981. The first reunion was held in July 1981. The Gibsland-Coleman Alumni Association is a non-profit organization of alumni and other individuals who are interested in supporting the organization-mainly providing college scholarships annually to graduating seniors. Chapters are located in Houston, Los Angeles, and Gibsland. The reunion is held in Gibsland annually during the first weekend of July.

Government officials
The present Mayor of Gibsland is Jeannie Richardson.  Ms. Richardson qualified to run for mayor in the 2022 elections against incumbent Mayor Ray Ivory.  Ms. Richardson won with a 67% majority.  Ms. Richardson assumed the position of Mayor in January 2023 and will serve a four-year term.  There are five Aldermen who serve on the Council of the Town of Gibsland.  Julius Pearson, Gary Durham, Angela Adams, Dianna Pearson and Debra Rushing all qualified to run in the 2022 election, and were unopposed; therefore, they assumed their positions in January 2022. All the councilmembers were on the previous council with the exception of Angela Adams.  This will be her first term.  All councilmembers
will serve a four-year term.

Notable people
 Charles M. Blow, journalist and columnist for The New York Times
 Jesse N. Stone, first African American justice on the Louisiana Supreme Court
 Victor King, Louisiana Tech Bulldogs basketball player, drafted by the Los Angeles Lakers
 Bernard King, son of Victor King, Texas A&M Aggies men's basketball player, played professionally overseas
 Ralph Hamner, professional baseball player for the Chicago White Sox and Chicago Cubs
 John McConathy, Northwestern State Demons basketball player and Syracuse Nationals draftee
 W. C. Robinson, second president of Louisiana Tech University (1899–1900)
 F. Jay Taylor, twelfth president of Louisiana Tech University (1962–1987)
 Sam Smith, first African American to serve as a Seattle city councilman
 Jimmy Wilson, blues musician (though his place of birth is disputed)
 William E. King, state legislator in the Illinois House of Representatives

References

Towns in Bienville Parish, Louisiana
Towns in Louisiana